Karen Grigory Sargsyan (born 18 December 1980) is the Minister of Internal Affairs of the Republic of Artsakh.ARKA News Agency - "Artsakh president appoints chief of police and head of emergency service", 27 January 2021. Retrieved 28 March 2021.Turan News Service - "Separatist leader rejects Karabakh's status within Azerbaijan", 26 January 2021. Retrieved 28 March 2021.

Career
From 2004 to 2014 he served in the republic's State Tax Service. From then until 2017 he served in a variety of task forces by decree of the President of Artsakh Bako Sahakyan. On 19 February 2019 he resigned or was dismissed from the post of representing the President at large.ArmInfo - "Karen Sargsyan dismissed from the post of Artsakh President`s  representative at large". Retrieved 28 March 2021. On 26 May 2020, the succeeding President, Arayik Harutyunyan, appointed Sargsyan as the Director of the State Service of Emergency Situations. On 26 January 2021 by decree of the President and head of the Government of Artsakh, Sargsyan was appointed as Minister of Internal Affairs.Official website of the government of the Republic of Artsakh - Ministry of Internal Affairs. Retrieved 28 March 2021.

The ministry has responsibilities in the areas of policing, fire and rescue, monitoring seismic activity and emergency response. Colonel Artyom Harutyunyan is the Chief of Police. On 20 February 2021, a delegation led by Andranik Piloyan, the Minister of Emergency Situations of Armenia, paid an official visit to the Republic of Artsakh. They were met by the President of Artsakh, the Minister of Internal Affairs, and by Mekhak Arzumanyan, the Director of the State Emergency Service of the Republic of Artsakh.Iravaban TV - "The President of the Artsakh Republic Arayik Harutyunyan received the Minister of Emergency Situations of the Republic of Armenia Andranik Piloyan: Artsakh SESS", 22 February 2021. Retrieved 28 March 2021. The two sides discussed cooperation between the two republics and how to respond to emergency situations.Official website of the Ministry of Emergency Situation of Armenia - "Minister of Emergency Situations of RA Andranik Piloyan paid a working visit to Artsakh". Retrieved 28 March 2021.

He is working with the President to discover the fate of the missing servicemen and civilians and to return the prisoners of war from Azerbaijan.Chap.am - "President of Artsakh receives several families of missing servicemen"m 11 February 2021. Retrieved 28 March 2021.

On 26 March 2021, the Minister dealt with a complaint concerning alleged stone throwing by Azeri servicemen on the Sarushen-Karmir village road. He handed photographic evidence to General Rustam Muradov of the Russian peacekeeping service.Republic of Armenia Public Television - "Artsakh police reports about incident between Armenians and Azerbaijanis on Sarushen-Karmir village road". 26 March 2021. Retrieved 28 March 2021.

Personal life
Sargsyan was born in Stepanakert. He is married with four children. In 2003, he graduated from Yerevan State University with a Master's degree in law. He completed his post graduate education at the Public Administration Academy before undertaking his military service.

References

1980 births
Living people
Executive branch of the government of the Republic of Artsakh